"Pushed Again" is a song by Die Toten Hosen. It is the only single and the fifth track from the album Crash-Landing.

The song is about being tormented by somebody and trying to get this somebody off the narrator's back.

Music video
The music video was directed by Ralf Schmerberg. It shows the band performing, interspersed with clips of many different cases of riots, police brutality and violation of human rights in many countries, i.e. notably in China.

Track listing
 "Pushed Again" (Breitkopf/Andreas Frege) − 3:49
 "Alles ist eins" (All is one) (von Holst/Frege) − 3:21
 "Fliegen" (Flying) (Frege/Frege) – 4:28
 "Revenge" (Meurer/Frege, T.V. Smith) − 3:59

Charts

Year-end charts

References

1998 singles
Die Toten Hosen songs
Songs written by Campino (singer)
Songs written by Michael Breitkopf